The Fall River is a  river tributary to the Pit River in north-eastern Shasta County in northern California. It is a designated Heritage and Wild Trout stream.

History
The river was named Fall River by John Frémont in 1848 because of its historic cascades and falls at the terminus of the river.

Ecology and conservation
The Fall River Conservancy and the Fall River Resource Conservation District both work to restore the river. The former has worked with the University of California Davis to study the trout and identified two distinct sub-populations, one adapted to the colder winter flows of Bear Creek and one adapted to the more constant temperature spring-fed waters of Spring Creek and the Fall River mainstem. The large volume of spring water inflow maintains Fall River water temperature at near optimum ranges for trout production, even during mid-summer.

The upper river has historically been characterized by abundant aquatic macrophytes, including extensive meadows of horned pondweed (Zannichellia palustris), however these have dramatically declined due to excessive sediment deposition due to fires in the watershed and channelization of a tributary stream.

Watershed and course
The Fall River watershed drains a  area that originates from Thousand Springs, and is largely spring-fed, with Bear Creek providing the only significant precipitation-related surface flow to the river. Its other two main tributaries, Spring Creek and the Tule River, are also spring-fed, with the latter originating in the Ahjumawi Lava Springs system. Fall River is a moderate sized, slow moving, meandering meadow stream with a mean gradient of less than 1 ft./mile. Spring Creek joins Fall River 5.2 miles below Thousand Springs, and seven miles below Spring Creek, Fall River is joined by Tule River. Since 1922 the river has been dammed before its confluence with the Pit River and diverted through a tunnel under Saddle Mountain to the Pit No. 1 Intake powerhouse, one of many hydroelectric dams on the Pit River.

See also
 Pit River

References

External links
 Fall River Conservancy website
 Fall River Resource Conservation District website

Pit River
Rivers of Shasta County, California
Tributaries of the Sacramento River
Shasta-Trinity National Forest
Rivers of Northern California